Thembinkosi Tevin Apleni is a South African politician who has been serving as a permanent delegate to the National Council of Provinces since May 2019. He is one of six permanent delegates from the Eastern Cape. Apleni is a member of the Economic Freedom Fighters (EFF) and serves as the party's deputy provincial chairperson. He was previously the party's provincial secretary.

Life and career
Apleni matriculated and soon achieved a diploma in paralegal studies. He joined the EFF after its inception and was appointed the party's provincial secretary in the Eastern Cape in 2015. In August 2016, Apleni was elected as one of the EFF's proportional representation councillors in Buffalo City. The first few months of Apleni's councillor term were marked by the ejection of the EFF caucus from council over a dress code dispute.

In October 2018, Apleni was elected the EFF's deputy provincial chairperson.

Parliamentary career
On 23 May 2019, Apleni became a permanent delegate to the National Council of Provinces from the Eastern Cape. He is one of nine permanent EFF representatives in the legislature. On 24 June, he was given his committee assignments.

Committee assignments
Select Committee on Education and Technology, Sports, Arts and Culture
Select Committee on Health and Social Services
Select Committee on Transport, Public Service and Administration, Public Works and Infrastructure
Select Committee on Trade and Industry, Economic Development, Small Business Development, Tourism, Employment and Labour

References

External links
Thembinkosi Tevin Apleni – People's Assembly

Living people
Year of birth missing (living people)
Xhosa people
People from the Eastern Cape
People from Buffalo City Metropolitan Municipality
Members of the National Council of Provinces
21st-century South African politicians
Economic Freedom Fighters politicians